The Rattazzi II government of Italy held office from 10 April 1867 until 27 October 1867, a total of 200 days, or 6 months and 17 days.

Government parties
The government was composed by the following parties:

Composition

References

Italian governments
1867 establishments in Italy